San Benedetto may refer to:

 Saint Benedict (c. 480-543/547), Italian saint
 Saint Benedict (disambiguation), a number of other Italian saints called San Benedetto (Saint Benedict)

Places of Italy
 San Benedetto Belbo, a municipality in the Province of Cuneo, Piedmont
 San Benedetto dei Marsi, a municipality in the Province of L'Aquila, Abruzzo
 San Benedetto del Tronto, a municipality in the Province of Ascoli Piceno, Marche
 San Benedetto in Perillis, a municipality in the Province of L'Aquila, Abruzzo
 San Benedetto Po, a municipality in the Province of Mantua, Lombardy
 San Benedetto Ullano, a municipality in the Province of Cosenza, Calabria
 San Benedetto Val di Sambro, a municipality in the Province of Bologna, Emilia-Romagna
 San Benedetto in Alpe, a village in the municipality of Portico e San Benedetto, Province of Forlì-Cesena, Emilia-Romagna
 San Benedetto, a village in the municipality of Cascina, Province of Pisa, Tuscany

Structures
 San Benedetto, Bologna, a church in central Bologna, Italy
 San Benedetto, Catania, a church in Catania, Italy
 San Benedetto, Florence, a church in Florence, Italy
 San Benedetto in Gottella, Lucca, a church in Lucca, Italy
 San Benedetto, Venice, also called San Beneto, a church in Venice, Italy
 San Benedetto monastery (Salerno), a former monastery, now part of the San Benedetto church in Salerno, Italy
 Teatro San Benedetto, a theatre in Venice, Italy

Other uses
 Acqua Minerale San Benedetto, Italian beverage manufacturer
 San Benedetto Tennis Cup, a red clay court professional tennis tournament in San Benedetto del Tronto, Italy